The Aphsad inscription of Ādityasena is an Indian inscription from the reign of the Later Gupta dynasty king Aditya-sena (r. c. 655-680 CE). The inscription was found in 1880 by Markham Kittoe in the village of Apasadha, Bihar, and is now located in the British Museum.

Content

Late Gupta dynasty

The inscription describes the genealogy and the deeds of the Late Gupta Dynasty kings up to Aditya-sena.

Fight against the Hunas
The inscription is especially known for mentioning that the Maukharis fought against the remnants of the Alchon Huns in the areas of the Gangetic Doab and Magadha (while the Aulikaras repelled them in the Malwa region). The Aphsad inscription of Ādityasena mentions the military successes of kings of the Later Gupta dynasty against the Maukharis, themselves past victors of the Hunas:

Constructions
The inscription also records the establishment of two religious buildings: a temple of Viṣṇu by king Ādityasena following the wish of his mother Mahādevī Śrīmati, and the construction of a tank by Koṇadevīi, queen of Ādityasena.

Text of the inscription

References

Asian objects in the British Museum
Indian inscriptions